Simon Digby was an Irish Anglican bishop at the end of the seventeenth century and the beginning of the eighteenth century. He was the son of Essex Digby and attended Trinity College Dublin.
After a short spell as Dean of Kildare in 1678–1679, he was nominated Bishop of Limerick, Ardfert and Aghadoe on 24 January 1679 and  consecrated on 23 March that year. He was summoned to attend the short-lived Patriot Parliament called by James II of England in 1689. In 1690 he was translated to Elphin, being nominated on 4 December and appointed by letters patent on 12 January the following year. He died in office on 7 April 1720.

References

1720 deaths
Deans of Kildare
Bishops of Limerick, Ardfert and Aghadoe
Anglican bishops of Elphin
Year of birth unknown
Diocese of Limerick, Ardfert and Aghadoe
18th-century Anglican bishops in Ireland
17th-century Anglican bishops in Ireland
Members of the Irish House of Lords